Krasnoznamensky (masculine), Krasnoznamenskaya (feminine), or Krasnoznamenskoye (neuter) is the name of several rural localities in Russia.

Altai Krai
As of 2010, one rural locality in Altai Krai bears this name:
Krasnoznamensky, Altai Krai, a settlement in Krasnoznamensky Selsoviet of Kuryinsky District

Bryansk Oblast
As of 2010, one rural locality in Bryansk Oblast bears this name:
Krasnoznamensky, Bryansk Oblast, a settlement in Baklansky Selsoviet of Pochepsky District

Kaliningrad Oblast
As of 2010, two rural localities in Kaliningrad Oblast bear this name:
Krasnoznamenskoye, Bagrationovsky District, Kaliningrad Oblast, a settlement in Dolgorukovsky Rural Okrug of Bagrationovsky District
Krasnoznamenskoye, Slavsky District, Kaliningrad Oblast, a settlement in Bolshakovsky Rural Okrug of Slavsky District

Kurgan Oblast
As of 2010, one rural locality in Kurgan Oblast bears this name:
Krasnoznamenskoye, Kurgan Oblast, a selo in Krasnoznamensky Selsoviet of Mishkinsky District

Mari El Republic
As of 2010, one rural locality in the Mari El Republic bears this name:
Krasnoznamensky, Mari El Republic, a khutor in Emekovsky Rural Okrug of Volzhsky District

Moscow Oblast
As of 2010, one rural locality in Moscow Oblast bears this name:
Krasnoznamensky, Moscow Oblast, a settlement under the administrative jurisdiction of   the City of Shchyolkovo in Shchyolkovsky District

Oryol Oblast
As of 2010, two rural localities in Oryol Oblast bear this name:
Krasnoznamensky, Kromskoy District, Oryol Oblast, a settlement in Retyazhsky Selsoviet of Kromskoy District
Krasnoznamensky, Uritsky District, Oryol Oblast, a settlement in Arkhangelsky Selsoviet of Uritsky District

Saratov Oblast
As of 2010, one rural locality in Saratov Oblast bears this name:
Krasnoznamensky, Saratov Oblast, a settlement in Samoylovsky District

Vladimir Oblast
As of 2010, one rural locality in Vladimir Oblast bears this name:
Krasnoznamensky, Vladimir Oblast, a settlement in Kameshkovsky District